Hardman & Co., otherwise John Hardman Trading Co., Ltd., founded 1838, began manufacturing stained glass in 1844 and became one of the world's leading manufacturers of stained glass and ecclesiastical fittings. The business closed in 2008.

History 

John Hardman senior, (1766–1844), of Handsworth, then in Staffordshire, England (and now part of Birmingham), was the head of a family business designing and manufacturing metalwork. He was described as the "opulent button maker and medallist".
In the 1830s Augustus Welby Pugin was commissioned by the Roman Catholic Bishop, Thomas Walsh, to design a suitable church to house the remains of St Chad, which had been rescued from destruction at Lichfield Cathedral during the Reformation. When the building was consecrated in 1841 as Saint Chad's Cathedral, it was the first Roman Catholic cathedral to be built in England since the Reformation. For the recently converted Catholic, Pugin, this was a commission of great importance.

Pugin first had contact with the John Hardmans during the construction of St Chad's Chapel, the forerunner to the cathedral scheme. John Hardman junior, (1812–67), left the family business in 1838 and set up on his own to manufacture ecclesiastical metalwork. Pugin employed Hardman's to provide metalwork for St Chad's Cathedral. Hardman was an enthusiastic donor, giving the rood screen to the cathedral and being recognised for his provision to various charities by the gift of the Hardman Chantry in which John Hardman senior was interred in 1844, and which remained the family burial place.

From 1845, at the urging of Pugin, John Hardman entered the burgeoning industry of stained glass manufacture. He was joined by his nephew, John Hardman Powell (1827–95) who married Pugin's daughter Anne in 1850, and claimed to be Pugin's only pupil. Powell became the chief designer from about 1849, prior to Pugin's death in 1852. The company took part in the Great Exhibition of 1851 in London, exhibiting the great chandelier designed for Alton Towers.

Hardman and Powell collaborated with A. W. Pugin's son, E. W. Pugin, firstly in the design of the funeral arrangements of John Talbot, 16th Earl of Shrewsbury in November 1852. The collaboration between the Hardman firm and the Pugins was to continue after E. W. Pugin's death in 1875 with the later firm, Pugin & Pugin. This collaboration lasted for three generations and was a major influence on Catholic church architecture and decoration in particular and the Gothic Revival in general.

Under the management of J.H. Powell the metalwork design department split from the stained glass department in 1883 and traded under the name Hardman, Powell and Co. Powell died in 1895, passing the leadership of the firm to John Bernard Hardman, the grandson of John Hardman Snr, who headed the company until 1903 and took the firm to the Exposition Universelle, Paris. The firm continued producing stained glass in the 21st century under directorship of Donald Taunton and Patrick A. Feeny until the 1970s, and had premises at 26 Frederick Street in the Jewellery Quarter, Birmingham, Newhall Hill and Lightwoods House. A large proportion of the Hardman archive, particularly their Medieval Room, was damaged and destroyed in a fire at the Newhall Hill studio in 1970; some of the earliest and most damaged cartoons are now held in temperature controlled storage at Birmingham Museum and Art Gallery. Hardman acquired the stained glass manufacturer Goddard & Gibbs in 2006, but two years later, in 2008, the business closed.

Design

Gothic Revival

Through the influence of A.W.Pugin, John Ruskin, and the Oxford Movement, it was considered during the mid-19th century that the only appropriate style in which a church should be built was Gothic.  This fashion was combined with a general renewal within the church and a growth of Roman Catholicism.  The result was that many designers in different fields tried to imitate the Medieval style in their work.  This was particularly the case in the stained glass industry.

Pugin, who supplied the first designs for Hardmans, was thoroughly absorbed in the Medieval and was a designer of the highest order.  He produced designs of every description- churches, windows, furniture, vestments, vessels, tiles, jewellery and, for the interiors of the Houses of Parliament, Gothic thrones, Gothic hat-stands and Gothic ashtrays.  With his busy regime, he increasingly relied upon his talented son-in-law, Powell, to provide the designs for stained glass.

The firm had many subcontractors and designers who are not well-known but produced exceptional work under the Hardman name. For example, the Pippet family of Solihull, William John Wainwright and R.J. Hopkins.

John Hardman Powell 
Powell's stained glass recreates the elegance, the refinement, the brevity that is seen in some of the finest examples of glass, sculpture and illumination of the 13th and 14th centuries.  He utilised the flowing, curving lines, the flourish of drapery, the calligraphic brushstrokes and pure colour.  However, Powell's work was not, like many stained glass designers, merely imitative.  His designs are original innovations in the Gothic style.  The quality of Hardman's church windows, particularly in the 1850s and 1860s, was superb.

Major commissions 

The most famous building that the Hardmans made glass for was the new Houses of Parliament in London, for which Pugin was the interior designer.  Pugin employed the Scottish firm of Ballantine and Allen to manufacture the windows that he designed for the House of Lords, but all the rest were made by Hardmans, who have maintained their relationship with that building, repairing and replacing glass damaged or destroyed during World War II.

Apart from the windows created for Pugin's churches in England and Ireland, two of Hardman's major commissions were to come from Australia.  In the 1860s the architect Edmund Blacket commissioned Hardmans to supply 27 windows, including a 6-light West window and a 7-light East window for St. Andrew's Cathedral, Sydney.  They were installed for the consecration in 1868.

In the 1880s William Wardell selected the same firm to provide windows for St. Mary's R.C. Cathedral in the same city.  This building, of which the nave was not completed until the 1930s, is very much larger than St Andrew's and has three large rose windows and an enormous East window, the tracery of which was based directly on that of Lincoln Cathedral, c.1280.  The design of this huge window, depicting the Coronation of the Blessed Virgin Mary is one of the pinnacles of achievement in Gothic Revival stained glass.

Buildings with glass by Hardmans 

England
 St. Nicholas' Church, Newbury, Berkshire
 Sandhurst Royal Memorial Chapel, Sandhurst, Berkshire
 St. Michael and All Angels' Church, Sandhurst, Berkshire
 St. Paul's Church, Wokingham, Berkshire
 St Pauls' Church, Clifton, Bristol
 St. Mary's Church, St Neots, Cambridgeshire
 Our Lady and St. Wilfrid's Church, Warwick Bridge, Cumbria
 St. Hieritha's Church, Chittlehampton, Devon
 Wynard's Chapel, Exeter, Devon
 Holy Trinity Church, Ilfracombe, Devon
 Gloucester Cathedral, Gloucester, Gloucestershire
 St. Peter's Church, Gloucester, Gloucestershire
 Tewkesbury Abbey, Tewkesbury, Gloucestershire
 St. Michael the Archangel's Church, Felton, Herefordshire
 St. Margaret's Church, Halstead, Kent
 St. Catherine's Church, Kingsdown, Kent
 Our Lady and St. Hubert's Catholic Church, Great Harwood, Lancashire
 St. Peter and St. Paul's Church, Algakirk, Lincolnshire
 St. Nicholas' Church, Lincoln, Lincolnshire
 Our Ladye Star of the Sea Church, Greenwich, London
 St. Peter's Roman Catholic Church, Woolwich, London
 St. James' Church, Heywood, Greater Manchester
 St. Margaret's Church, Clenchwarton, Norfolk
 All Saints' Church, Dickleburgh, Norfolk
 St. Andrew's Church, Framingham Pigot, Norfolk
 St. John the Baptist Cathedral, Norwich, Norfolk
 Holy Cross Church, Byfield, Northamptonshire
 All Saints' Church, Dunsden Green, Oxfordshire
 St. Lawrence's Church, North Hinksey, Oxfordshire
 St. Michael and St. James' Church, Haunton, Staffordshire
 Cranleigh School Chapel, Cranleigh, Surrey
 St. Mary Magdalen's Church, Brighton, East Sussex
 Arundel Cathedral, Arundel, West Sussex
 Arundel Castle, Arundel, West Sussex
 St. Joseph's Roman Catholic Church, Avon Dassett, Warwickshire
 St. Chad's Cathedral, Birmingham, Warwickshire
 St. Augustine's Church, Edgbaston, Warwickshire
 St. Mary Magdalene's Church, Great Alne, Warwickshire
 St. Cyprian's Church, Hay Mills, Warwickshire
 All Saints' Church, Ladbroke, Warwickshire
 St. Laurence's Church, Northfield, Warwickshire
 St. Mary's Church, Selly Oak, Warwickshire
 Worcester Cathedral, Worcester, Worcestershire
 St. Agatha's Church, Gilling West, North Yorkshire
 St. Mary and St. Romuald's Church, Yarm, North Yorkshire
 Church of St. Nicholas, High Bradfield, South Yorkshire
 All Souls' Church, Halifax, West Yorkshire
 Meanwood Towers, Meanwood, West Yorkshire

Northern Ireland
 St. Patrick and St. Colman's Cathedral, Newry, County Armagh

Scotland
 St. Patrick's Church, Anderston, Lanarkshire

Australia
 St. Edward's Catholic Church, Canowindra, New South Wales
 St. Andrew's Cathedral, Sydney, New South Wales
 St. Mary's Cathedral, Sydney, New South Wales
 Sacred Heart Convent Chapel, Ballarat, Victoria
 St. Patrick's Cathedral, Ballarat, Victoria
 St. Francis Xavier's Cathedral, Geraldton, Western Australia

United States of America
 St. Peter Chanel Catholic Church, Roswell, Georgia
 Grace and St. Peter's Church, Baltimore, Maryland

See also

 Mary Juliana Hardman

Other early 19th-century firms 
 Thomas Willement
 William Warrington
 Charles Edmund Clutterbuck
 William Wailes
 Augustus Welby Pugin
 Earley and Company

Context 
 Stained glass
 British and Irish stained glass (1811–1918)
 Victorian era
 Gothic Revival
 Poor Man's Bible

References
Notes

Bibliography
 John Hardman Trading Co.,Ltd.,
Roderick O'Donnell, The Pugins and the Catholic Midlands, Gracewing, Archdiocese of Birmingham Historical Commission, 2002
 Elizabeth Morris, Stained and Decorative Glass, Doubleday, 
 Sarah Brown,  Stained Glass : an Illustrated History, Bracken Books, 
 Simon Jenkins, England's Thousand Best Churches, Allen Lane, the Penguin Press, 
 John Harvey, English Cathedrals, Batsford, 1961, ISBN unknown
 Robert Eberhard, Church Stained Glass Windows, 
 Cliff and Monica Robinson, Buckinghamshire Stained Glass,  
 Mathé Shepheard, The Stained Glass of John Hardman and Company under the leadership of John Hardman Powell from 1867 to 1895,
 Bill Covington, 'J.A Pippet and Hardman, Powell & Company', True Principles, vol. 2 No. 3, 2001 
 Michael J. Fisher, "Hardman of Birmingham; Goldsmith and Glasspainter", Landmark Publishing. 2008, 
 Michael J. Fisher, "Guarding the Pugin Flame - John Hardman Powell 1827-1895", Spire Books 2017

External links

British stained glass artists and manufacturers
Glassmaking companies of England
Companies established in 1838
Defunct companies based in Birmingham, West Midlands
Manufacturing companies based in Birmingham, West Midlands
1838 establishments in England